"With You" is a song performed by American contemporary worship band Elevation Worship. On April 5, 2019, it was released as the lead single from their album, Paradoxology (2019). The song was written by Chris Brown, Steven Furtick and Tiffany Hudson. Aaron Robertson handled the production of the single. 

"With You" peaked at No. 22 on the US Hot Christian Songs chart.

Background
Elevation Worship released "With You" on April 5, 2019, as the lead single to Paradoxology (2019), an album of largely consisting of reimagined tracks on their 2018 live album, Hallelujah Here Below.

On August 30, 2019, Elevation Worship released the live version of "With You" on their extended play, At Midnight.

Composition

Commercial performance
"With You (Paradoxology)" debuted at No. 22 on the US Hot Christian Songs chart dated April 20, 2019, concurrently charting at No. 4 on the Christian Digital Song Sales chart. The song spent a total of twenty non-consecutive weeks on Hot Christian Songs Chart.

Music videos
The official music video for "With You (Paradoxology)" shot on location at Savona Mill was published on Elevation Worship's YouTube channel on April 5, 2019. Elevation Worship released the official lyric video for the song on YouTube on May 3, 2019. On October 21, 2019, Elevation Worship released the live performance video of the song on YouTube. On October 28, 2019, Elevation Worship uploaded the acoustic performance video of the song on YouTube.

Charts

Weekly charts

Year-end charts

Release history

References

External links
 

2019 singles
Elevation Worship songs
2019 songs
Songs written by Steven Furtick